The Institute of Hotel Management, Catering Technology and Applied Nutrition, Guwahati is an education institution for training students in hotel management, catering technology, general food management, and allied subjects, located in Guwahati, the capital of Assam, India. It was established by the Ministry of Tourism of the Government of India in 1984 as the Food Craft Institute. It was upgraded to an Institute of Hotel Management in 1995 and is affiliated with National Council for Hotel Management and Catering Technology.

In 2016, a few of the IHMCTANs (Ahmedabad, Bhopal, Jaipur) started giving students the option to choose only vegetarian cooking. All IHMCTANs, including IHMCTAN Guwahati, is expected to start offering a vegetarian cooking option from academic year 2018 onwards.

References

External links
 Official site

Education in Guwahati
Universities and colleges in Assam
Hospitality schools in India
Educational institutions established in 1984
1984 establishments in Assam
Ministry of Tourism (India)
Institute of Hotel Management